IHH Healthcare Berhad is an international private healthcare group focused on upmarket health services, and is Asia's largest private healthcare group. It offers a full spectrum of integrated healthcare services from clinics to hospitals to highly specialised care and a wide range of acute medical services. It is headquartered in Kuala Lumpur and has a wide geographical footprint throughout Malaysia, Singapore, Turkey, India, Greater China (including Hong Kong)  and across Asia and, Central and Eastern Europe. The group has over 65,000 employees across 80 hospitals in 10 countries. It is listed on Bursa Malaysia and the Singapore Exchange. In recent years, IHH has expanded significantly in India and mainland China.

Its portfolio of healthcare brands includes Pantai, Gleneagles and Prince Court in IHH Malaysia; Mount Elizabeth, Gleneagles, and Parkway in IHH Singapore; Gleneagles and ParkwayHealth in IHH Greater China; Fortis, Global and Continental in IHH India; and Acibadem in Turkey. IHH's subsidiaries include Pantai Holdings, Parkway Holdings, ParkwayLife REIT and Fortis.

IHH also owns the International Medical University in Kuala Lumpur and is the majority shareholder of Acıbadem Healthcare Group, the largest Turkish private healthcare company. IHH owns 52.3% of the Hyderabad-based private healthcare provider Continental Hospitals Limited in India.

The largest shareholder of IHH Healthcare is Mitsui of Japan followed by the Malaysian government's sovereign wealth fund Khazanah Nasional and Citigroup of the United States. A further stake is held by the Employees Provident Fund of Malaysia.

The chairman of IHH is Dato' Mohammed Azlan bin Hashim.

See also
 Gleneagles Hospital Kota Kinabalu
 Gleneagles Hospital Kuala Lumpur

 Gleneagles Hospital Penang

References

External links
 IHH Healthcare

 
Health care companies established in 1974
1974 establishments in Malaysia
Health care companies of Singapore
Health care companies of Malaysia
Companies listed on the Singapore Exchange
Companies listed on Bursa Malaysia
Companies based in Kuala Lumpur
Malaysian brands
Government-owned companies of Malaysia
Khazanah Nasional